Dihibahiri is a  village in the Contai III CD block in the Contai subdivision of the Purba Medinipur district in the state of West Bengal, India.

History
When the largest  man-made waterbody in the area, Bhimsagar, was being dug, many antiquities were recovered and some were believed to belong to the Shunga-Kushan era (around 1st BC to 1st century AD). Much later, the Contai area was a part of the Hijli Kingdom, which existed between 1687 and 1886.

Geography

Location

Marishda is about 10 km from Contai on the Contai-Nandakumar Road (National Highway 116B). Dihibahiri is linked with Marishda by a short stretch of local roads.

Note: The map alongside presents some of the notable locations in the subdivision. All places marked in the map are linked in the larger full screen map.

Demographics
According to the 2011 Census of India, Dihibahiri had a total population of 161, of which 79 (49%) were males and 82 (51%) were females.

Culture
According to the board put up by the Archaeological Survey of India at Dihibahiri, the temple of Jagannath was built in 1584. It further says that it was heard that Bhimsen Mahapatra, King of Odisha, built this temple. It is a rekha-type structure with jagmohana (pirha type) in the front. (A picture of the board is provided. It can be enlarged to verify the information).

Dihibahiri Jagannath temple is a state protected monument.

Dihibahiri picture gallery

Healthcare
Kharipukuria Block Primary Health Centre at Kharipukuria, PO Nachinda Bazar (with 10 beds) is the main government medical facility in Contai III CD block.

References

External links

Villages in Purba Medinipur district
Tourist attractions in Purba Medinipur district